Ålberga (local pronunciation Ålbärja) is a locality situated in Nyköping Municipality, Södermanland County, Sweden with 247 inhabitants in 2010.

Elections 
Ålberga and Stavsjö are the two main settlements of the Kila electoral ward.

Riksdag

References 

Populated places in Södermanland County
Populated places in Nyköping Municipality